The Arctic Corsair (H320) is a deep-sea trawler, built in 1960, that was converted to a museum ship in 1999. She is temporarily berthed at Alexandra Dock in Kingston upon Hull, England, pending completion of a new permanent location in the city's Museums Quarter. Exhibits and guides aboard the boat tell the story of Hull's deep-sea fishing industry.

Description
The Arctic Corsair is Hull’s last surviving sidewinder trawler, a type of ship that formed the backbone of the city’s deep sea fishing fleet. She was built in 1960, at Cook, Welton & Gemmell in Beverley, and was the second diesel-engined trawler built for the Boyd Line, the first being the Arctic Cavalier which was launched the previous month. She was designed for the harsh conditions encountered in the Icelandic grounds, having a rivetted rather than welded hull.

History
In September 1967 Arctic Corsair was holed on her starboard side in a collision off the coast of Scotland with the Irish collier Olive in thick fog. Attempting to reach harbour in Wick she was beached in Sinclair Bay but eventually repaired and refloated.

In 1973, she broke the world record for landing of cod and haddock from the White Sea.

On 30 April 1976 during the cod wars, she rammed the offshore patrol vessel  in the stern, after Óðinn had made three attempts to cut the Corsair's trawl warps. The skipper, Charles Pitts, said that Icelandic seamen were becoming "more ambitious and dangerous in their tactics". With his ship holed below the waterline, and patched up temporarily by the Royal Navy, Pitts decided to head for home for permanent repairs. Arctic Corsair was out of action for several months. In 2017, the vessels, now both museum ships, exchanged their  bells as a gesture of cooperation.

In 1978 she was converted for midwater trawling, and in 1981 laid up at Hull. In 1985 she was taken out of retirement and reconverted for normal fishing. She was renamed Arctic Cavalier in 1988.

Museum ship

In 1991, a campaign led by Adam Fowler of fishing heritage group STAND secured £45,000 from the DTI Hull Task Force which enabled Hull City Council to purchase the trawler in 1993. The vessel immediately reverted to Arctic Corsair, and was berthed between Drypool Bridge and Myton Bridge in the River Hull as a museum ship.

After being restored by trainees and volunteers from the STAND, the floating museum opened to the public in 1999. STAND entered into partnership with the City Council to provide volunteers to maintain and act as tour guides. Today, the floating museum is run entirely by volunteers but supported by Hull City Council.  Arctic Corsair is temporarily closed during restoration work.

In June 2018 to was announced that she was to move to dry-dock in September 2018 while flood defence work is undertaken on the River Hull. This was delayed while other flood defence work was undertaken but on 4 August 2019 was she moved to a temporary berth in Alexandra Dock. Later she will move to a new permanent berth in the redeveloped North End Shipyard in Dock Office Row as part of the Hull Maritime City project, back in the Museums Quarter; initial groundwork on the shipyard's visitor centre commenced in November 2022. On 6 October 2021, she was moved by two tugs to Dunston's shipyard to undergo restoration work.

See also 
 Middle-water trawler Ross Tiger, last surviving vessel of the rival fleet across the Humber at Grimsby
 Viola (trawler)  Middle-water traditional 'bridge-aft-sider' trawler. In derelict condition with hopes of regeneration.

References

External links

"Arctic Corsair" - Hull City Council

Fishing vessels of the United Kingdom
Museum ships in the United Kingdom
Museums in Kingston upon Hull
1960 ships
Museums established in 1999
Ships and vessels on the National Register of Historic Vessels